The Civil Aviation Authority (AACM) is the civil aviation authority in the special administrative region of Macau, China and is responsible for controlling and regulating air its traffic and airspace.

Its head office is on the 18th floor of the Cheng Feng Commercial Centre in Sé. 

The AACM is an agency under the Secretariat for Transport and Public Works. It was formally created in 1991 to replace the Macau International Airport Office that had been established in 1987. Some of the roles of the Airport Office was taken over by the CAM-Macau International Airport Company Limited.

The AACM is headed by a president who reports to the general committee (as a member) and the administrative committee (as the head). , Simon Chan Weng Hong is the president of the AACM.

Like its Hong Kong counterpart, the AACM is independent from the Civil Aviation Administration of China. The AACM controls the airspace within Macau. It also investigates aviation accidents and incidents.

See also

Civil Aviation Department (Hong Kong)

References

External links
Official website
Official website 
Official website 

1991 establishments in Macau
Macau
Government departments and agencies of Macau
Aviation in Macau
Government agencies established in 1991
Organizations investigating aviation accidents and incidents
Civil aviation in China
Transport organizations based in China